不再娃娃 Not a Little Girl Anymore is the eighth studio album of cantopop singer Prudence Liew, released in January 1992.

Background information
This is the first Liew studio album released by Columbia Records.  Sony Music Hong Kong reportedly spent over $ 1 million in recording equipment for the recording of this album. Unlike previous albums that include multiple cover versions of Europop songs, the entirety of this album are original compositions.  Among the composers and lyricists working on this album include Conrad Wong, Dick Lee, Tai Chi, Tony Arevejo Jr. and Liew herself.

Track listing
 各自各… 精彩 (Each Shining Their Own Way)
 小驚大怪 (Little Scare, Big Reaction)
 Touch Me Feel Me
 思潮 (Waves of Thoughts)
 不著地的飛鳥 (A Never Descending Bird)
 China Girl
 娃娃歲月 (The Ages of a Little Girl)
 死心塌地 (Devoted)
 釋放 (Releasing)
 Wooh!

References

1992 albums
Prudence Liew albums
Columbia Records albums